Alessandro Giardelli (born 5 October 2002 in Seriate) is an Italian professional racing driver currently racing with the Ebimotors team in the 2022 Porsche Carrera Cup Italy, he is vice champion of the 2021 Porsche Carrera Cup Italy and champion of the Porsche Scholarship Programme in his first season as a rookie. And also competed in the Porsche Supercup, which takes place on the same weekends as Formula 1. He was champion of the Karting Italian Championship, Giardelli is the Youngest driver ever to race in the KZ1 top karting category in Karting World Championship in 2017 at only 14 years old.

Career

Karting 

Giardelli began his career in 2012. Since then he has won numerous national and international competitions and awards. Accomplishments include first place in the Italian Open Masters, third place at WSK Night Edition, eighth place and fifth place in the WSK Champions Cup, fourth place in the WSK Final Cup, first place in the Rok Cup Italy, fifth place in the Rok Cup International final, fifth place in the Trofeo Margutti, second place in the industry trophy, First place in the 500 miles of Granja Viana, third place in the race of Karting European Championship and the victory of a race in the Karting World Championship. He competed for the CRG (kart manufacturer) official team, and   Tony Kart which is part of the OTK group and also racing for the official team Lariomotorsport.

Formula 

Giardelli took part in official tests both with a Formula Renault car and a Formula 4 car.

Touring car racing 

Giardelli in 2020 he signed with the team Elite Motorsport and did it to race in the TCR Italy Touring Car Championship. Before the start of the championship Giardelli ends the contract with the Elite Motorsport team to join the B.D Racing team. Makes his debut at the Autodromo Enzo e Dino Ferrari di Imola in the Coppa Italia Turismo obtaining a second place in qualifying and third and second place in the two races of the weekend. The following week he made his debut in the TCR Italy Touring Car Championship on the Mugello Circuit always with the same team he obtained a surprising pole position giving eight tenths of a second to the second classified  and he finished third in race 1 for technical problems, in Race 2 managed to obtain a victory at the debut and with this result he in first position in the championship with 43 points. In the second round of TCR Italy Touring Car Championship on Misano World Circuit Marco Simoncelli after a fifth place in qualifying, in Race 1 an engine problem while he was fighting for the podium forces him to the tenth position, during Race 2 a contact with another driver damages his car finish the race in eleventh position but getting the fastest lap of the race.

In the third round of TCR Italy Touring Car Championship in Autodromo enzo e dino ferrari of Imola he switches to a Honda Civic Type R TCR with sequential gearbox in the MM Motorsportt team officially supported by Honda JAS Motorsport. In qualifying Giardelli gets fifteenth place for a red flag that forces him to cancel his lap when he was about to set a time that would take him to the top five positions, in race 1 he starts fifteenth and some problems force him to a difficult race but still manages finishing in eleventh position, in race 2 instead, in the rain, he always starts in fifteenth position and another driver during the first lap at the first corner misses the braking point hitting him and damaging his car, forcing him to retire. In the fourth round of the TCR Italy Touring Car Championship in Vallelunga Circuit Giardelli immediately proved very competitive in free practice 1 he obtained the fourth time by completing only 2 laps, in free practice 2 he managed to get the first absolute time. In qualifying Giardelli gets a second place. In race one he starts second and maintains this position until the end of the race. In race 2 instead Giardelli starts seventh due to the regulation of the inverted grid which foresees the inversion of the first eight of the qualifications but despite this he puts in place an excellent comeback with many battles and  closes with an excellent second position overall and first among the under 25. Giardelli obtained the best time on the official test day in Autodromo Nazionale di Monza before the fifth round of the TCR Italy Touring Car Championship. In the fifth round of the TCR Italy Touring Car Championship Giardelli obtained the best time in the first free practice and the seventh time in the second free practice. In qualifying Giardelli obtained third place Giardelli in race 1 finished eighth after a contact with another driver then penalized. Giardelli in race 2 while he was fighting for the victory has a puncture after a contact with another driver penalized also in this case which forces him to stop in the pits to replace the tire making him finish the race in twelfth position. Giardelli did not take part in the last race of the championship in Autodromo enzo e dino ferrari.

GT Car racing 

After the excellent results obtained in the TCR Italy Touring Car Championship, in September 2020 Giardelli had the opportunity to make his debut driving the Porsche 911 GT3 Cup of the Centro Porsche Ticino team in the Porsche GT3 Cup Challenge Suisse at Mugello Circuit, immediately obtaining an extraordinary pole position on his debut and victory in the race.

Giardelli in 2021 after the good results obtained in 2020 signs for the Dinamic Motorsport team and it is announced that he will take part in the Porsche Carrera Cup Italy.  Giardelli makes his debut in the Italian GT Championship in May on the occasion of the first championship race at Autodromo Nazionale di Monza he always does it with the Dinamic Motorsport team in the GT CUP class Giardelli obtains excellent results during the weekend with both dry and wet track scoring the 2 place in qualifying 1 and the pole position in qualifying 2  instead in the respective two races he gets a second and a fourth place. Giardelli took part in the official pre season tests of the Porsche Carrera Cup Italy in Imola on May 18, obtaining the fifth fastest time of the day. He made his debut in the Porsche Carrera Cup Italy in Misano World Circuit Marco Simoncelli on the occasion of the first race of the 2021 championship, obtaining the fifth place in free practice, in qualifying he obtained the eighth place, in race 1 he recovered up to fifth place and in race two he obtained an excellent podium in third place at debut in the category resulting the best among the drivers of the Porsche Scholarship Program. In the second round of Porsche Carrera Cup Italy in Mugello Circuit Giardelli starts the weekend well immediately, obtaining the best time in the official free practice on Friday, on Saturday he gets the 4th time in qualifying and in Race 1 he finished on the podium with the third place and gets the fastest lap, in Race 2 on Sunday he gets another podium finishing in second position, with these two podiums Giardelli confirms himself in 3 position in the championship and first of the drivers of the Porsche Scholarship Program, obtaining 3 podiums out of 4 races disputed in the series. Giardelli after the excellent results obtained in Porsche Carrera Cup Italy  is called to replace Simone Iaquinta who suffered an injury in Imola and in doing so makes his debut in the Porsche Supercup in Hungary on the same weekend of Formula 1. Giardelli makes a good race given the lack of knowledge of the track by the driver seen only for the first time in free practice and of the new 992 without ABS control but still gets a twentieth place in free practice, in qualifying he improves and closes 16th place with the first set of tires was in the top 10 but then due to the traffic he was unable to improve with the second set, in the race he makes an excellent comeback, finishing tenth on his debut in the Porsche Supercup.

Giardelli also race in the last two round of Porsche Supercup racing at the Italian Grand Prix in Monza doble race since the cancellation of the silverstone race, a weekend not easy for Giardelli considering the few km covered with the Porsche 992 without abs he gets a 20th and 18th place in qualifying in Race 1 on Saturday he arrives 22 for a contact while he was in 16 position, in Race 2 he arrives 20 after having had damage to his front splitter.

In the fourth round of the Porsche Carrera Cup Italy at Vallelunga Circuit Giardelli arrived as leader of the championship standings he obtained the second place in free practice, in qualifying he obtained the fifth place in Race 1 on Saturday while he was fighting for the podium he was hit by another driver and finished in sixth position. In Race 2 on Sunday he obtained a podium finish in second position and he maintaining the leadership of the championship. In the fifth round of the Porsche Carrera Cup Italy in Autodromo of Franciacorta during the Porsche Festival Giardelli has a difficult weekend having set up problems on the car he never finds the right feeling he only gets the ninth time in qualifying on a very difficult track for overtaking Giardelli in race 1 he ends eighth after a contact that makes him lose the chance to fight for the top 5, in Race 2 still ends in eighth place. in the last championship race in Autodromo Nazionale di Monza Giardelli starts the title immediately on the right way, concluding free practice in fourth place with more worn tires than his rivals, in qualifying obtains an extraordinary pole position by beating the record of the Monza track with a Porsche Cup in Race 1 he won a dominates race in rainy weather conditions, lapping more than a second per lap faster than his rivals. In Race 2 Giardelli arrives with seven points of  advanced but due to the regulation of the discards with a point of separation in the standings from his rival for the championship Giardelli start 6 in the grid due to the inverted grid and his direct rival 4 who arrives in front he wins, Giardelli has a bad luck race with a contact to the aroggia variant that expels him from the fight, however he closes the championship in second position and first in the Porsche Scholarship Program in his debut season.  In November 2021 Giardelli took part in Porsche international shoot out . 

Giardelli in 2022 announces that he will take part in the Gt World Challenge Europe season shortly before the start of the championship he changes the plans by returning to the Porsche Carrera Cup Italy with the Ebimotors team with the support of the Porsche Center Varese, in the first round of the championship Giardelli has an unlucky weekend obtaining 7th place in qualifying and 11th place in both races.

Formula One 
In 2018 when he was in the official Tony Kart team he wore the Ferrari Driver Academy logo on both the helmet, the suit and the Kart.

Personal life 
Giardelli's brother Luca Giardelli is also a racing driver.
In 2013 the Giardelli family opened a circuit and called it Lariomotorsport and then a Karting team with the same name.

Public image and influence 

Giardelli went viral with his videos on Facebook several times, the most surprising video was a video shot on his personal track Lariomotorsport with shifter kart KZ1, the video reached over 10 million view sand another time always in Lariomotorsport during a video of an Ohvale test as well this has reached millions of views.

Racing record

Career summary 

† As Giardelli was a guest driver, he was ineligible for points.
* Season still in progress.

Motorsports career results

Complete TCR Italy Touring Car Championship DSG 
(key) (Races in bold indicate pole position) (Races in italics indicate fastest lap)

Complete TCR Italy Touring Car Championship 
(key) (Races in bold indicate pole position) (Races in italics indicate fastest lap)

Complete Porsche Carrera Cup Italy 
(key) (Races in bold indicate pole position) (Races in italics indicate fastest lap)

* Season still in progress.

Complete Porsche Supercup results
(key) (Races in bold indicate pole position) (Races in italics indicate fastest lap)

* Season still in progress.

References

External links 

 

2002 births
Living people
Italian racing drivers
Karting World Championship drivers
Porsche Supercup drivers